James Hay Upcher (b Wreningham 17 January 1854 – d Harare 17 March 1931) was Archdeacon of Mashonaland from 1925 until his death.

Upcher was educated at Trinity College, Cambridge was ordained deacon in 1877 and Priest in 1878. After curacies in Halesworth, Sudbourne, Barnham Broom and Bury St Edmunds he held incumbencies at Sprowston,  and Sculthorpe. He was a missionary at St Bernard's Mission, Selukwe from 1923 to 1925; and Priest in charge of St Mary, Hunyani from 1927 until his death.

Notes 

1854 births
1931 deaths
19th-century Anglican priests
20th-century Anglican priests
Alumni of Trinity College, Cambridge
Archdeacons of Mashonaland
People from South Norfolk (district)